Job 12 is the twelfth chapter of the Book of Job in the Hebrew Bible or the Old Testament of the Christian Bible. The book is anonymous; most scholars believe it was written around 6th century BCE. This chapter records the speech of Job, which belongs to the Dialogue section of the book, comprising Job 3:1–31:40.

Text
The original text is written in Hebrew language. This chapter is divided into 25 verses.

Textual witnesses
Some early manuscripts containing the text of this chapter in Hebrew are of the Masoretic Text, which includes the Aleppo Codex (10th century), and Codex Leningradensis (1008).

There is also a translation into Koine Greek known as the Septuagint, made in the last few centuries BC; some extant ancient manuscripts of this version include Codex Vaticanus (B; B; 4th century), Codex Sinaiticus (S; BHK: S; 4th century), and Codex Alexandrinus (A; A; 5th century).

Analysis
The structure of the book is as follows:
The Prologue (chapters 1–2)
The Dialogue (chapters 3–31)
The Verdicts (32:1–42:6)
The Epilogue (42:7–17)

Within the structure, chapter 12 is grouped into the Dialogue section with the following outline:
Job's Self-Curse and Self-Lament (3:1–26)
Round One (4:1–14:22)
Eliphaz (4:1–5:27)
Job (6:1–7:21)
Bildad (8:1–22)
Job (9:1–10:22)
Zophar (11:1–20)
Job (12:1–14:22)
The Wicked Prosper but I Am Suffering (12:1–6)
God's Hand in Creation (12:7–12)
God's Active Control of the World (12:13–25)
Job's Stance (13:1–3)
Job's Rebuke of His Friends (13:4–12)
Addressing the Friends (13:13–19)
Addressing God (13:20–28)
The Brevity of Human Life (14:1–6)
The Lack of Hope for Humans (14:7–12)
Job's Imaginative Exploration of Hope (14:13–17)
The Lack of Hope – Again (14:18–22)
Round Two (15:1–21:34) 
Round Three (22:1–27:23)
Interlude – A Poem on Wisdom (28:1–28)
Job's Summing Up (29:1–31:40)

The Dialogue section is composed in the format of poetry with distinctive syntax and grammar. Chapters 12 to 14 contain Job's closing speech of the first round, where he directly addresses his friends (12:2–3; 13:2, 4–12).

Job believes God's hand in creation (12:1–12)
Job points out that some who are wicked are prospering, regardless how the righteous is rewarded or is suffering, and that the life of the nature all are in God's hand (verse 9). Job suggests his friends to look behind the 'age-old traditions' and 'past-dogmas' to 'the God who is both the source of all wisdom' and the one in control of all creation (verse 12).

Verse 9
[Job said:] "Who among all these does not know
that the hand of the Lord has done this,"
"The LORD": translated from the Hebrew YHWH, which is the only reference to this name outside the narrative frame (Prologue and Epilogue) or the YHWH speeches (Job 38–41). Three manuscripts of Kennicott and two of de Rossi have the word “God” instead.

Verse 10
In whose hand is the life of all living things
and the breath of every human being?

Job believes God's active control of the worlds (12:13–25)
This section follows Job's statements in verse 12 (which can also be read as rhetorical questions) to declare the wisdom and might of God (verse 13) whose sovereign activity can be observed in all areas and situations of life (verses 14–25).

Verse 23
[Job said:] "He increases the nations and destroys them;
He enlarges the nations and guides them."
"Increases": from the Hebrew verb , masgiʾ (“makes great”) is a common Aramaic word, but only found in Hebrew text in Job 8:11, 12:23 and 36:24.
Job uses the rise and fall of nations, which does not seem to be governed by any moral principle, as an example of God’s arbitrary power, which is spelled out in detail in Daniel's interpretation of King Nebuchadnezzar's dream (Daniel 2) how no group of humans can thwart the purpose of God Almighty.

See also

Related Bible parts: Job 9, Job 16, Job 42

References

Sources

External links
 Jewish translations:
 Iyov - Job - Chapter 12 (Judaica Press) translation [with Rashi's commentary] at Chabad.org
 Christian translations:
 Online Bible at GospelHall.org (ESV, KJV, Darby, American Standard Version, Bible in Basic English)
 Book of Job Chapter 12. Various versions
  Various versions

12